Fritz Joseph Ursell FRS (28 April 1923 – 11 May 2012) was a British mathematician noted for his contributions to fluid mechanics, especially in the area of wave-structure interactions. He held the Beyer Chair of Applied Mathematics at the University of Manchester from 1961 to 1990, was elected Fellow of the Royal Society in 1972 and retired in 1990.

Education
Ursell came to England as a Jewish refugee in 1937 from Germany. From 1941 to 1943 he studied at Trinity College, Cambridge, graduating with a bachelor degree in mathematics.

Career
At the end of 1943 Ursell joined the Admiralty as a part of a team—headed by George Deacon (not John Deacon) —whose task was to formulate rules for forecasting waves for the allied landings in Japan. Their findings have become the basis of modern wave-forecasting. Ursell stayed in the Admiralty until 1947. In 1947 he was appointed to a post-doctoral fellowship in applied mathematics
at Manchester University without a doctorate. In 1950 he returned to Cambridge as lecturer. There he met G. I. Taylor. In 1957 he spent a year at Massachusetts Institute of Technology, having been invited by Arthur Ippen. In 1961 Ursell moved back to Manchester.

In 1994 Ursell was awarded the Gold Medal of the Institute of Mathematics and its Applications in recognition of his "outstanding contributions to mathematics and its applications over a period of years".

Scientific work 
In 1957 he published together with Clive R. Chester and Bernard Friedman a classic paper that introduced a method to find asymptotic expansions for contour integrals with coalescing saddle points. The method is now called method of Chester–Friedman–Ursell.

Personal life
Fritz Ursell was married to Katharina Renate Zander in 1959. They had two daughters. Susie and Ruth, Susie is married and has two children. Following his death on 11 May, in hospital, Ursell's funeral took place on 15 May 2012 at Manchester Crematorium.

References

Academics of the University of Manchester
Alumni of Trinity College, Cambridge
20th-century British mathematicians
21st-century British mathematicians
Fellows of the Royal Society
Fluid dynamicists
Jewish emigrants from Nazi Germany to the United Kingdom
1923 births
2012 deaths